The ICL8038 waveform generator was an Integrated circuit by Intersil designed to generate sine, square and triangular waveforms, based on bipolar monolithic technology involving Schottky barrier diodes. ICL8038 was a voltage-controlled oscillator capable of producing frequencies between a millihertz and 100 kHz., some specimens capable of reaching 300 kHz. The device has been discontinued by Intersil in 2002.

Triangular waves were produced by charging and discharging a capacitor with constant currents. The triangular waves were converted to sine waves involving a non-linear network. The output frequency was set either by resistors or the external control voltage. The temperature drift could be optimized to less than 250ppm/°C by combining it with a PLL.

See also
 555 timer IC

References

Linear integrated circuits